Tore Nilsen (born 10 May 1960) is a retired Norwegian football defender.

Hailing from Dramsvegen in Tromsø, Soleng joined Tromsø IL as an eight-year old and after making his first-team debut in 1977 he became a stalwart in central defense. He helped win the 1986 Norwegian Football Cup. A one-club man, he amassed 384 games across all competitions, and also had a brother Bjørn Nilsen who played two games for Tromsø.

References

1960 births
Living people
Sportspeople from Tromsø
Norwegian footballers
Tromsø IL players
Norwegian First Division players
Eliteserien players
Association football defenders